Pulletop is a rural locality in the south eastern part of the Riverina - it used to be called Pullitop.  It is situated by road, about 5 kilometres east south-east of Burrandana  and 9 kilometres north of Westby.

See also
 Pulletop bushfire

Notes and references

Towns in the Riverina
Towns in New South Wales